Siedlce  (formerly ) is a district (dzielnica) of the city of Gdańsk, Poland, with 17,584 inhabitants (area 2.6 km2).

It includes the area around Kartuska Street, the main road out of Gdańsk towards Kartuzy). Recently, a new dual carriageway, Domestic Army Avenue, was built along the boundary between Siedlce & Chełm. This was built as a bypass to the single-carriageway Kartuska St. for intercity traffic.

Important buildings
In Siedlce there is a Neo-Gothic Catholic church, which is the center of the Parish of St Francis of Assisi. It is situated on Ulica Struga. There are also two schools in Siedlce, both close to Kartuska Street.

External links
 Map of Siedlce
 Old map of Schidlitz

Districts of Gdańsk